= Colony Club, Virginia =

Unincorporated community in Virginia, United States

Coordinates: 36°33′48″N 77°51′09″W

Colony Club is an unincorporated community located in Brunswick County, in the U.S. state of Virginia.
